The play-offs of the 2020 Billie Jean King Cup Americas Zone Group I were the final stages of the Group I zonal competition involving teams from the Americas. Using the positions determined in their pools, the seven teams faced off to determine their placing in the 2020 Billie Jean King Cup Americas Zone Group I. The top two teams advanced to the 2020 Billie Jean King Cup Play-offs, while the bottom two teams were relegated to Americas Zone Group II for 2022.

Pool results

Promotional play-offs 
The first-placed teams of each pool played against one another in a head-to-head round. The winners of each round advanced to the 2020 Billie Jean King Cup Play-offs.

Paraguay vs. Mexico

Argentina vs. Colombia

Relegation play-offs 
The third-placed teams of each pool played against one another in a head-to-head round. The loser of the tie was relegated to Americas Zone Group II in 2022, alongside Peru who finished fourth in Pool B.

Venezuela vs. Chile

Final placements 

References

External links 
 Billie Jean King Cup website

2020–21 Billie Jean King Cup Americas Zone